The Democratic Karen Buddhist Army (DKBA) was an insurgent group of Buddhist soldiers and officers in Myanmar that split from the predominantly Christian led Karen National Liberation Army (KNLA), one of the largest rebel factions in Myanmar. Shortly after splitting from the KNLA in December 1994, the DKBA signed a ceasefire agreement with the government of Myanmar in exchange for military and financial assistance; provided that it supported government offensives against the KNU (the political wing of the KNLA) and its allies.

History

Formation
The DKBA was formed for a variety of reasons. A Buddhist monk named U Thuzana had started a campaign in 1992 of constructing pagodas in Karen State, including at the KNU headquarters of Manerplaw. As the KNU leadership would not grant permission for construction of the pagodas, claiming they would attract government air strikes, Thuzana began to encourage KNLA soldiers to desert the organisation. Following a couple skirmishes and failed negotiations in early December 1994, the DKBA announced its formation and its split from the KNU on 28 December 1994.

2000s
Pado Mahn Shar, the secretary-general of the Karen National Union, was assassinated at his home in Mae Sot, Thailand, on 14 February 2008. Several analysts claim that the assassination was possibly carried out by soldiers of the DKBA, though this has never been confirmed.

2010s

In 2010, the informal alliance between the government and the DKBA began to deteriorate in the aftermath of the Burmese general elections in 2010, when the DKBA clashed violently with Tatmadaw forces. The violence caused a massive exodus of refugees across the border into Thailand, particularly through border crossings controlled by the DKBA. On 12 November, Al-Jazeera English reported that the DKBA had joined forces with the Karen National Liberation Army, a move believed to be in response to the threat of a government crackdown.

Dissolution and creation of the DKBA-5
In 2010, DKBA soldiers split away from the organisation and renamed themselves the Democratic Karen Benevolent Army - Brigade 5 (DKBA-5), which was led by Bo Nat Khann Mway (Saw Lah Pwe). The newly formed group originally had five brigades under its control (hence its name), but currently commands only three.

Resurgence
DKBA under the original name of Democratic Karen Buddhist Army reemerged under the command of Saw Kyaw Thet, a brigadier general who split away from DKBA-5. In early June 2021, a combined force of five armed groups; Democratic Karen Buddhist Army, PDF, KNU/KNLA Peace Council (KPC), Karen National Defence Organisation (KNDO) and a Karen Border Guard Force (BGF) splinter group clashed with Tatmadaw and Karen BGF in Phlu village, Karen state. Brigadier General Saw Kyaw Thet, cstated that the five armed groups are cooperating throughout Karen state.

References

External links
 Revolution Reviewed: The Karens' Struggle for Right to Self-determination and Hope for the Future Saw Kapi, 26 February 2006, retrieved on 2006-11-30
 Fifty Years of Struggle: A Review of the Fight for the Karen People's Autonomy (abridged) Ba Saw Khin, 1998 (revised 2005), retrieved on 2006-11-30
 Determined Resistance: An Interview with Gen. Bo Mya The Irrawaddy, October 2003
 Photos by James Robert Fuller

Rebel groups in Myanmar
History of Myanmar
Politics of Myanmar
Karen people
Buddhist paramilitary organizations
Paramilitary organisations based in Myanmar
Buddhist nationalism
Religious organizations established in 1994
Religious organizations disestablished in 2010